Robert Edward Wiss (February 20, 1929 – October 23, 1995) was a lawyer who served as a judge of the United States Court of Appeals for the Armed Forces from 1992 until his death in 1995. He retired from the United States Naval Reserve Judge Advocate General's Corps as a rear admiral in 1988.

Early life and education
Born and raised in Chicago, Wiss graduated from the West High School in 1946. He attended the University of Illinois and earned a B.A. degree in 1950. Commissioned as an ensign through the NROTC program, Wiss served in the United States Navy during the Korean War and then transitioned to the Naval Reserve in 1953. Returning to school, he completed his J.D. degree at the Northwestern University School of Law in 1956.

Career
As a Navy ensign, Wiss served aboard the carriers  and USS Sicily. He later held staff positions in Tokyo and at the United Nations Peace Conference in Kaesong.

In 1959, Wiss joined Thomas A. Foran's law firm. He later became a senior partner in Foran, Wiss & Schultz. Wiss served as legal counsel for seven cases before the United States Court of Appeals for the Seventh Circuit and six cases before the United States Supreme Court, one of which was Elrod v. Burns.

At various points during his legal career, Wiss served as special assistant attorney general for the state of Illinois, special assistant corporation counsel for the city of Chicago, special assistant states attorney for Cook County, Illinois and general counsel for the public administrator of Cook County.

Wiss continued to serve as a lawyer in the Naval Reserve and was advanced to commodore in 1983 and rear admiral in 1986. From 1984 to 1988, he served as director of the Naval Reserve Law Program.

On October 2, 1991, President George H. W. Bush nominated Wiss and Herman F. Gierke to two new seats on the United States Court of Military Appeals. They appeared before the Senate Committee on Armed Services on November 12, 1991, and were confirmed by unanimous consent of the full Senate two days later.

On January 2, 1992, Wiss joined the Court of Military Appeals (later renamed the Court of Appeals for the Armed Forces). While still serving as a judge, he died at Sibley Memorial Hospital in 1995.

Personal
Wiss was married to Charlene J. Sternaman (July 14, 1930 – January 22, 2017). They had three daughters and nine grandchildren.

Wiss and his wife were interred at Arlington National Cemetery.

References

1929 births
1995 deaths
University of Illinois Urbana-Champaign alumni
Military personnel from Illinois
United States Navy personnel of the Korean War
United States Navy reservists
Northwestern University Pritzker School of Law alumni
Lawyers from Chicago
Recipients of the Legion of Merit
United States Navy admirals
Judges of the United States Court of Appeals for the Armed Forces
United States Article I federal judges appointed by George H. W. Bush
People from Washington, D.C.
Burials at Arlington National Cemetery